Countess Park railway station served the village of Bellingham, Northumberland, England from 1859 to 1861, during the construction of the Border Counties Railway.

History 
The station was situated on the south side of an unclassified road between Heugh and High Countess Park, the NBR providing a temporary platform with a run-around loop. The run-around loop was retained for some years in connection with the transport of sandstone from the nearby Mill Knock Quarry.

Timetable

References

External links 

Disused railway stations in Northumberland
Former North British Railway stations
Railway stations in Great Britain opened in 1859
Railway stations in Great Britain closed in 1861
1859 establishments in England
1861 disestablishments in England